Biku may refer to:

 Biku, Bajestan, a village in Jazin Rural District, in the Central District of Bajestan County, Razavi Khorasan Province, Iran
 Biku, Fars, village in Jereh Rural District, Jereh and Baladeh District, Kazerun County, Fars Province, Iran
 Biku, village comes under orro panchayat in the Nardiganj block of the Nawada district in the state of Bihar, India